Rákoscsaba is a former town in Hungary now part of District XVII of Budapest. Rákoscsaba was united with Budapest on 1 January 1950. The Hijackers Bike Park was opened in 2013 in Rákoscsaba.

See also
 Rákosmente
 Budapest

External links

Rákosmente
Neighbourhoods of Budapest
Former municipalities of Hungary